Dennis Andersson (born 3 June 1991) is a Swedish  motorcycle speedway rider who is riding for the Atlas Wrocław in the Polish Speedway Ekstraliga. Andersson won the 2010 Under-19 European Champion title.

Career details

European Championships 

 Individual U-19 European Championship
 2008 -  Stralsund - 7th place (9 pts)
 2009 -  Tarnów - 7th place (8 pts)
 2010 -  Goričan - Under-19 European Champion (14+3 pts)
 Team U-19 European Championship
 2009 -  Holsted - Runner-up (8 pts)

See also 
 Sweden national speedway team
 Speedway in Sweden

References 

Swedish speedway riders
1991 births
Living people
Individual Speedway Junior European Champions